

People
 Dave Lattin (born 1943), American basketball player
 Don Lattin, American journalist and author
 Susannah Lattin (1848–1868), American woman whose death led to regulation of maternity clinics in New York City
 Vernon Lattin (born 1938), American president of Brooklyn College

Places
 Lattin, County Tipperary, a village in County Tipperary, Ireland
 Lattin, West Virginia, U.S.
 Lattingtown, a village on Long Island, New York

See also
 Latin